Reinier van Persijn (1615 – 23 November 1668) was a Dutch Golden Age engraver of portraits and bookplates.

Biography
According to Houbraken, who called him Reynier van Parzyn, he was married to the granddaughter of the stained glass painter Wouter Crabeth I, whose son Wouter Crabeth II he probably knew from his time in Rome, where they were both members of the Bentvueghels.
His bent or nickname was Narcissus (Daffodil). He settled in 1645 in Gouda, where his wife was born.

He was a student of Cornelis Bloemaert and learned the art of publishing book title pages from Theodor Matham, son of Jacob Matham. According to an old Dutch Who's Who, while in Italy he engraved pieces from the Justiani gallery, made a famous engraving of Baldassare Castiglione and had a motto, Het moet al in een pers zijn, meaning It must already be in print, which was a play on words, because Pers-zijn was his name.

References

1615 births
1668 deaths
Dutch engravers
Dutch Golden Age printmakers
People from Alkmaar
Members of the Bentvueghels